Ralf Mojsiejenko (born January 28, 1963) is a former American football punter in the National Football League from (1985–1991) for three teams. He played college football at Michigan State University. Of Ukrainian descent, he came to the United States when he was nine months old.
He currently resides in his childhood hometown of Bridgman, Michigan with his wife Mary, daughter Alexandra, and two sons Parker and Cooper. Ralf’s youngest son Cooper, attributable, followed Ralf’s punting and kicking skillset competing at Central Michigan University for four years. 

As a college kicker, his first field-goal attempt of his career was a successful 61-yarder in 1982 against the University of Illinois.

References

1963 births
Living people
American Conference Pro Bowl players
American football punters
American people of Ukrainian descent
German emigrants to the United States
German people of Ukrainian descent
German players of American football
Michigan State Spartans football players
People from Salzgitter
Players of American football from Michigan
San Diego Chargers players
San Francisco 49ers players
Sportspeople from Lower Saxony
Washington Redskins players